Acri may refer to:

Acri, a town in the province of Cosenza, southern Italy
Association for Civil Rights in Israel
 African Crisis Response Initiative, now African Contingency Operations Training and Assistance, a United States training program
American Committee for Relief in Ireland
Associazione fra le Casse di Risparmio Italiane, now Associazione di Fondazioni e di Casse di Risparmio S.p.A., an Italian banking association

People with the surname
Bob Acri (1918–2013), American jazz pianist and composer

See also
 Acre (disambiguation)